Pangio doriae is a species of ray-finned fish in the genus Pangio.

Footnotes 

 

Pangio
Fish described in 1892